Landgrave Frederick of Hesse-Philippsthal-Barchfeld (1727 in Grave – 1777 in Barchfeld) was the oldest son of Landgrave William of Hesse-Philippsthal-Barchfeld and his wife, Charlotte Wilhelmine of Anhalt-Bernberg-Hoyn.  He succeeded his father as Landgrave of Hesse-Philippsthal-Barchfeld in 1761.

In 1772, he married Wild- and Rhinegravine Sophia Henrietta of Salm-Grunbach (1740-1800).  The marriage remained childless.  Frederick died in 1777 and was succeeded by his brother Adolph.

Ancestry

References 

 Johann Samuel Ersch (Hrsg.): Allgemeine Encyclopädie der Wissenschaften und Künste in alphabetischer ... S. 297

House of Hesse
Landgraves of Hesse
1727 births
1777 deaths
18th-century German people